Afaa Michael Weaver (born 1951 Baltimore, Maryland), formerly known as Michael S. Weaver, is an American poet, short-story writer, and editor. 
He is the author of numerous poetry collections, and his honors include a Fulbright Scholarship and fellowships from the National Endowment for the Arts, Pew Foundation, and Kingsley Tufts Poetry Award. He is the Director of the Writing Intensive at The Frost Place.

Life
Born in Maryland, he studied two years at the University of Maryland. He started 7th Son Press and the literary journal Blind Alleys. He graduated from Brown University on a fellowship, with an M.A, and Excelsior University with a B.A. He taught at National Taiwan University and Taipei National University of the Arts as a Fulbright Scholar, and was a faculty member at the Cave Canem Foundation's annual retreat. In addition, he was the first to be named an elder of the Cave Canem Foundation.  He also studied Chinese language at the Taipei Language Institute in Taiwan.

He teaches at Simmons College, and is director of the Zora Neale Hurston Literary Center. He is Chairman of the Simmons International Chinese Poetry Conference. Tess Onwueme, the Nigerian playwright, gave him the Ibo name "Afaa", meaning "oracle", while Dr. Perng Ching-hsi has given him the Chinese name "Wei Yafeng".

His poems have appeared in literary journals and magazines including Callaloo.

Honors and awards
 2014 Kingsley Tufts Poetry Award
 2002 Fulbright Scholarship
 1985 National Endowment for the Arts Literature Fellowship
 1998 Pew Fellowships in the Arts

Published works
Full-length poetry collections

 Spirit Boxing (Pitt Poetry Series, 2017)
 The City of Eternal Spring (Pitt Poetry Series, 2014)
 "A Hard Summation" (Central Square Press, 2014)
 "The Government of Nature" (Pitt Poetry Series, 2013)
 The Plum Flower Dance: Poems 1985 to 2005 (University of Pittsburgh Press, 2007)
 
 
 Timber and Prayer: The Indian Pond Poems (University of Pittsburgh Press, 1995)
 My Father’s Geography (University of Pittsburgh Press, 1992)
   Callaloo series
 

Plays
 Rosa was produced in 1993 at Venture Theater in Philadelphia

Anthologies edited

Anthology publications

References

Sources
 Library of Congress Online Catalog > Afaa M. Weaver

External links
 Author's Website
 Author Profile: 
 Audio: The Cortland Review > Issue 32, June 2006 > Zombie Dance/Tapping The Blood Root by Afaa M. Weaver
 Criticism: Ploughshares > Fall 2002 > A Review by Afaa M. Weaver of Leaving Saturn by Major Jackson

1951 births
Living people
American male poets
Writers from Baltimore
Poets from Maryland
National Endowment for the Arts Fellows
Simmons University faculty
Excelsior College alumni
Brown University alumni
Pew Fellows in the Arts
University of Maryland, College Park alumni